The Somalia Battalion is a separatist military unit of the Russian-backed Donetsk People's Republic in Ukraine, which has been fighting against the Armed Forces of Ukraine in the Donbas war and the 2022 Russian invasion. The battalion's full name is 1st Separate Tank Battalion Somalia (previously 1st Separate Battalion Tactical Group Somalia).

The unit is permanently stationed in Donetsk and Makiivka. Its current commander is Timur Kurilkin.

History 

The Somalia Battalion was formed in 2014 and participated in the Donbas war. The origin of its name is unconfirmed, it could be due to the fact that when its members lined up for the first time, they were dressed in motley clothing and thus looked not like a combat force, but Somali pirates. Or it could be from Givi's claim; "they are as fearless as Somali pirates".

It was originally a special task force under the Ministry of Defense of the Donetsk People's Republic, a self-proclaimed breakaway state in eastern Ukraine. In 2015 the breakaway states Donetsk People's Republic and Luhansk Peoples Republic, and all their military units, were designated as terrorist organisations by the Supreme Court of Ukraine.

In February 2017, the unit's commander, Mikhail Tolstykh ('Givi'), was assassinated in his office with a RPO-A Shmel rocket launcher. It is alleged he was killed by his own side because he knew who shot down Malaysia Airlines Flight 17, or that he was killed by Ukrainian forces.

The battalion took part in the Siege of Mariupol alongside Russian forces during the 2022 Russian invasion of Ukraine. In 2022, while being decorated by the head of the DPR, Denis Pushilin, Senior Lieutenant of the Somalia Battalion Roman Vorobyov was shown wearing a Totenkopf (used by the 3rd SS Panzer Division and the SS-Totenkopfverbände) and a valknut on his arm patch; both symbols are associated with neo-Nazism. The part of the video showing Vorobyov was later deleted when it was posted on Pushilin's website.

Equipment

The battalion has T-64 and T-72 tanks, BMP-1, BTR-70, MT-LB and BRDM-2 armoured fighting vehicles as well as supporting artillery, mortars and transport vehicles.

See also
 Russian separatist forces in Donbas
 Prizrak Brigade
 Sparta Battalion

References

Separatist forces of the war in Donbas
Military of the Donetsk People's Republic
Tank units and formations
Pro-Russian militant groups
Paramilitary organizations based in Ukraine